Ping'an may refer to:

Places
Ping'an Avenue, major through route in Beijing, China
Ping'an County, in Qinghai Province, China
Ping'an Township, name of several towns in China
Ping'an, Lanzhou, in Honggu District, Lanzhou, Gansu
Ping'an, Qing'an County, in Heilongjiang
Ping'an, Baicheng, in Taobei District, Baicheng, Jilin
Ping'an, Shulan, in Jilin
Ping'an, Ping'an County, in Qinghai
Ping'an Town, name of several townships in China
Ping'an Town, Zhangjiachuan County, in Gansu
Ping'an Township, Fengjie County, in Chongqing
Ping'an Township, Pengshui County, in Chongqing
Ping'an Township, Zhangjiachuan County, in Zhangjiachuan Hui Autonomous County, Tianshui, Gansu
Ping'an Township, Gongcheng County, in Guilin
Ping'an Township, Jiamusi, in Jiao District, Jiamusi, Heilongjiang
Ping'an Township, Hure Banner, in Tongliao, Inner Mongolia
Ping'an Township, Dawa County, in Liaoning
Ping'an Township, Zhangwu County, in Liaoning
Ping'an Township, Yuechi County, in Guang'an, Sichuan
Ping'an Community, name of several communities in China
Ping'an, Dongsheng, Shishou, Jingzhou, Hubei

Other uses
Ping An Finance Centre
Ping An Insurance, Chinese insurance company
Ping An Bank

See also
 Anping (disambiguation)
 Ping (disambiguation)
 An (disambiguation)